Professor Eugenia Shi-Chia Chang is a Member of Parliament of the Inkatha Freedom Party in the National Assembly of the Republic of South Africa.

In the late 1980s and early 1990s, she was the president of China Garments Manufacturing (now CGM Group), which opened the first Taiwan-owned plant in the South African homeland of Ciskei. CGM Group was, by about 2003, based in South Africa and operates several large apparel production plants in Lesotho and in Dimbaza, with Chang as senior executive. It appears that Chang is no longer the owner of CGM Group.

In 2004, Chang was the spokesperson on trade and industry for the Inkatha Freedom Party. In 2005, she declared to the Parliament remunerated employment outside Parliament at these employers, all in the manufacturing sector: United Clothing (Pty) Ltd, CGM Industrial (Pty) Ltd, and Presitex Enterprises (Pty) Ltd. She also declared a residential property of 200m² in Bisho.

See also
South Africa–Taiwan relations

References
 
  Introductory Remarks by Paul Ryberg at AGOA Forum Workshop on End of the MFA, Tuesday, 9 December 2003, 9:00 pm: mentions Eugenia Chang
 Inkatha press release (28 October 2004): IFP says that Black Economic Empowerment cannot be tailor-made for the elite
 Members' Interests: Parliament of the Republic of South Africa (2005)
 Who's Who in Southern Africa: Professor Eugenia CHANG

Journalism mentioning Chang
 Free China Journal (1991): mentions Eugenia Chang
 Mail and Guardian: Minister says 290 000 pirate DVDs seized. 4 October 2004
 Pursuit magazine (April/May 2005): mentions Eugenia Chang as the former owner of China Garments
 Business Report: China, SA ink clothing and textile trade deal. 22 June 2006
 Fin24: State disowns Proudly SA. 21 June 2007

External links
 Parliament of South Africa: Eugenia Shi-Chia Chang

Year of birth missing (living people)
Living people
South African politicians of Chinese descent
Inkatha Freedom Party politicians
Members of the National Assembly of South Africa
South African people of Chinese descent
Women members of the National Assembly of South Africa